Homoljac is a village in Croatia. It is connected by the D52 highway.

Geography
Homoljac is about 11 km northwest of Korenica. It is located between Vrhovine and Otočac.

History
After the breakup of Yugoslavia, Homoljac was in the Republic of Serbian Krajina. Until the territorial reorganization in Croatia, the settlement was part of the former municipality of Korenica.

Demographics 
According to the 2011 census, Homoljac had a population of 21.

References 

Populated places in Lika-Senj County